Assahifa Al Ousbouia (English: The Weekly Paper) is an Arabic language weekly newspaper in Morocco.

History and profile
Assahifa Al Ousbouia was founded in 1998. It is a sister publication of Le Journal Hebdomadaire, now-defunct weekly news magazine. Both were established by Aboubakr Jamai in the late 1990s under the names of Le Journal and Assahifa, respectively.

In 2000, the Moroccan government closed down both publications. They were later relaunched under their current names.

References

1998 establishments in Morocco
Newspapers established in 1998
Newspapers published in Morocco
Arabic-language newspapers
Weekly newspapers